Newaygo State Park is a public recreation area covering  on the south side of Hardy Dam Pond in Big Prairie Township, Newaygo County, Michigan. The state park sits atop  embankments overlooking the six-mile-long (10 km),  impoundment of the Muskegon River.

History
The park was created in 1966 when the state leased acreage that included  of water frontage from Consumers Power Company.

Activities and amenities
The park offers swimming, fishing for bass, walleye and panfish, boat launch, picnicking, playground, and 99 rustic campsites.

References

External links
Newaygo State Park Michigan Department of Natural Resources
Newaygo State Park Park Michigan Department of Natural Resources

State parks of Michigan
Protected areas of Newaygo County, Michigan
Protected areas established in 1966
1966 establishments in Michigan
IUCN Category III
Grand Rapids metropolitan area